Duntulm Castle stands ruined on the north coast of Trotternish, on the Isle of Skye in Scotland, near the hamlet of Duntulm. During the 17th century it was the seat of the chiefs of Clan MacDonald of Sleat. It is a scheduled monument.

History 
It is believed that, in prehistoric times, a broch or dun, known as Dun David, or Dun Dhaibhidh stood here.  However, no archaeological evidence has been found for this predecessor.

The castle was built in the 14th and 15th centuries, when the area was subject to feuds between the rival MacLeod and Macdonald clans. The defences were improved in the 16th century, and by the early 17th century the MacDonalds had finally gained the upper hand in the area. In 1618 the Privy Council and Sir Donald MacDonald of Sleat, "Donald Gorm Og", the 9th chief, signed a charter, requiring him to repair Duntulm. This was done, and a second tower was added. Around 1650, the castle's importance peaked, when further improvements were made, and a rectangular structure or house was built within the wall. Around 1732 the castle was abandoned, when Sir Alexander MacDonald built a new residence, Monkstadt House,  to the south, robbing much of the castle's stone as building material.

The castle
It is further defended by a ditch along the landward side. It comprises the vaults of a tower, which once stood to four-storeys, surrounded by an irregular curtain wall. The only entrance was via a narrow cleft in the sea cliff. The ruins of the castle are now in a very poor condition, with major falls of masonry as recently as 1990.

Legend
According to one local legend, the castle was abandoned after the infant son of the chieftain who dwelt there at the time, in the charge of a nursemaid, fell from a window and was dashed on the rocks below.  As a punishment, the nursemaid was set adrift on the North Atlantic in a small boat.

References

Castles in the Isle of Skye
Clan Donald
Scheduled Ancient Monuments in Highland